Chychkan Game Reserve is a protected area in Toktogul District, Jalal-Abad Region, Kyrgyzstan. Established in 1973, it covers 36,000 hectares.

References
 

Game reserves in Kyrgyzstan
Protected areas established in 1974